Felix Scheder-Bieschin (22 October 1899 – 2 September 1940) was a German sailor who competed in the 1936 Summer Olympics.

During World War II he served in Kriegsmarine as a Korvettenkapitan and was killed in action off the coast of Norway.

In 1936 he won the bronze medal as crew member of the German boat Germania III in the 8 metre class event.

References

External links
 profile

1899 births
1940 deaths
German male sailors (sport)
Olympic sailors of Germany
Sailors at the 1936 Summer Olympics – 8 Metre
Olympic bronze medalists for Germany
Military personnel from Kiel
Olympic medalists in sailing
Kriegsmarine personnel killed in World War II

Medalists at the 1936 Summer Olympics